Short Range Reconnaissance Escadrille (Eskadra Bliskiego Rozpoznania) was a unit of the Polish Naval Air Squadron (Morski Dywizjon Lotniczy) at the beginning of world war 2.

Air Crew 
Commander: kpt. mar. obs. Marian Janczewski

Equipment  
10 Lublin R-XIIIter and Lublin R-XIIIG floatplanes.

See also
Polish Air Force order of battle in 1939

References
 

Polish Air Force escadrilles